The Willard L. Proctor Memorial Stakes was an American Thoroughbred horse race run annually in late May at Hollywood Park Racetrack in Inglewood, California. Open to two-year-old horses, it was contested on dirt over a distance of five and one half furlongs. The event offered a purse of US$75,000 added plus a $22,500 bonus for horses bred in the State of California. The race was discontinued with the closure of Hollywood Park

In 1999 and 2000, the race was contested at four and one half furlongs and at five furlongs from 2001 through 2005.

Inaugurated in 1953 as the Westchester Stakes, for that first year only it was restricted to fillies. From 1979 through 1982 the race was run as the First Act Stakes. There was no race in 1983 and in 1984 it reverted to its original Westchester Stakes title until 2000 when it was renamed to honor for long-time California trainer Willard L. Proctor who died in 1998.

The race was on hiatus from 1985 through 1994. In 1964 and 1976 it was run in two divisions.

Records
Speed Record: (at  furlongs)
 1:02.97 - J P's Gusto (2010)

Most wins by a jockey:
 6 - Laffit Pincay, Jr. (1971, 1972, 1974, 1975, 1976, 2000)

Most wins by a trainer:
 3 - Jerry Dutton (1978, 1995, 1999)
 3 - Michael C. Harrington (1996, 2003, 2005)
 3 - Peter Miller (2007, 2008, 2011)

Most wins by an owner:
 3 - Heinz Steinmann (1996, 2003, 2005)

Winners

References
 May 26, 2008 Los Angeles Times article on the 2008 Willard L. Proctor Memorial Stakes

Horse races in California
Hollywood Park Racetrack
Flat horse races for two-year-olds
Restricted stakes races in the United States
1953 establishments in California
Discontinued horse races in the United States